Palladium fluoride is the name of a series of binary compounds of palladium and fluorine. These include:

 Palladium(II) fluoride or palladium difluoride, PdF2
 Palladium(II,IV) fluoride or palladium trifluoride, PdF3. It is not palladium(III) fluoride (which is unknown), and is often described as palladium(II) hexafluoropalladate(IV), PdII[PdIVF6]
 Palladium(IV) fluoride, or palladium tetrafluoride, PdF4
 Palladium(VI) fluoride, or palladium hexafluoride, PdF6, which is calculated to be stable

Palladium-fluorine coordination complexes have been developed to catalyse the synthesis of aryl fluorides, which are otherwise difficult to make.

References

Palladium compounds
Fluorides
Platinum group halides